is a railway station on the Tsugaru Railway Line in the town of Nakadomari, Aomori, Japan, operated by the private railway operator Tsugaru Railway Company.

Lines

Station layout
The station has one side platform serving a single bidirectional line. There is no station building, but only a weather shelter on the platform. The station is unattended.

History
Kawakura Station was opened on April 24, 1932. The station building was reconstructed in 1967. It was closed on April 1, 1943, but reopened on May 20, 1955.

Surrounding area

See also
 List of railway stations in Japan

External links

 

Railway stations in Aomori Prefecture
Tsugaru Railway Line
Nakadomari, Aomori
Railway stations in Japan opened in 1932